Shay Pinhas Ben David (Hebrew: שי פנחס בן דוד; born 19 July 1997 in Tel Aviv) is an Israeli footballer.

Career

Ben David started his career with Israeli top flight side Maccabi Haifa.

In 2018, he was sent on loan to Hapoel Afula in the Israeli second division.

For the second half of 2019/20, Ben David was sent on loan to Italian second division club Trapani Calcio.

In 2020, he was sent on loan to San Fernando CD in the Spanish third division.

References

External links
 Shay Ben David at Soccerway

1997 births
Israeli footballers
Living people
Association football defenders
Israel youth international footballers
Israel under-21 international footballers
Maccabi Haifa F.C. players
Hapoel Ashkelon F.C. players
Hapoel Afula F.C. players
F.C. Ashdod players
Hapoel Kfar Saba F.C. players
Trapani Calcio players
San Fernando CD players
Israeli expatriate footballers
Expatriate footballers in Spain
Expatriate footballers in Italy
Israeli expatriate sportspeople in Spain
Israeli expatriate sportspeople in Italy
Footballers from Tel Aviv